The Altes Museum (English: Old Museum) is a listed building on the Museum Island in the historic centre of Berlin. Built from 1825 to 1830 by order of King Frederick William III of Prussia according to plans by Karl Friedrich Schinkel, it is considered as a major work of German Neoclassical architecture. It is surrounded by the Berlin Cathedral to the east, the Berlin Palace to the south and the Zeughaus to the west. Currently, the Altes Museum is home to the Antikensammlung and parts of the Münzkabinett. As part of the Museum Island complex, the Altes Museum was listed as a UNESCO World Heritage Site in 1999, because of its testimony to the development of museums as a social and architectural phenomenon.

Planning and location
In the early nineteenth century, Germany's bourgeoisie had become increasingly self-aware and self-confident. This growing class began to embrace new ideas regarding the relationship between itself and art, and the concepts that art should be open to the public and that citizens should be able to have access to a comprehensive cultural education began to pervade society. King Friedrich Wilhelm III of Prussia was a strong proponent of this humboldtian ideal for education and charged Karl Friedrich Schinkel with planning a public museum for the royal art collection.

Schinkel's plans for the Königliches Museum, as it was then known, were also influenced by drafts of the crown prince, later King Friedrich Wilhelm IV, who desired a building that was heavily influenced by antiquity. The crown prince even sent Schinkel a pencil sketch of a large hall adorned with a classical portico.

Schinkel's plans incorporated the Königliches Museum into an ensemble of buildings, which surround the Berliner Lustgarten (pleasure garden). The Stadtschloss in the south was a symbol of worldly power, the Zeughaus in the west represented military might, and the Berliner Dom in the east was the embodiment of divine authority. The museum to the north of the garden, which was to provide for the education of the people, stood as a symbol for science and art—and not least for their torchbearer: the self-aware bourgeoisie. For the front facing the Lustgarten, a simple columned hall in grand style and proportionate to the importance of the location would most certainly give the building character. The arrangement of the eighteen Ionic columns was effected by the Lustgarten. The portico was designed with a function in order to give the museum building an exterior befitting its site, in which the monuments can be placed.

Schinkel had developed plans for the Königliches Museum as early as 1822/23, but construction did not begin until 1825. Construction was completed in 1828 and the museum was inaugurated on 3 August 1830. Schinkel was also responsible for the renovation of the Berliner Dom in the neo-classical style (which was originally a baroque cathedral), and he exercised considerable influence on Peter Joseph Lenné's renovation of the Lustgarten, which coincided with the construction of the museum, resulting in a harmonized and integrated ensemble.

In 1841, King Friedrich Wilhelm IV announced in a royal decree, that the entire northern part of the Spree Island (now known as Museum Island) "be transformed into a sanctuary for art and science". In 1845, with the completion of the Neues Museum, the "New Museum", the Königliches Museum was renamed the Altes Museum, the name it holds to this day.

History

The royally appointed commission, which was responsible for the conception of the museum, decided to display only "High Art" in the proposed building which included Old Master paintings and prints and drawings on the upper floor, as well as Classical sculpture from ancient Greece and Rome on the ground floor. This precluded the incorporation of ethnography, prehistory and the excavated treasures of the ancient Near East from Assyria and Persia (and elsewhere); instead, these artifacts were primarily housed in Schloss Monbijou.

With the completion of the Neues Museum (New Museum) by Friedrich August Stüler in 1855, Museum Island began to take form. This was followed by the Nationalgalerie (now the Alte Nationalgalerie) by Johann Heinrich Strack (1876), the Kaiser-Friedrich-Museum (now the Bodemuseum) by Ernst von Ihne after plans by Stüler (1904), and the Pergamonmuseum by Alfred Messel and Ludwig Hoffmann (1930). Thus Museum Island evolved into the institution it is today.

Julius Carl Raschdorff's 1894–1905 reconstruction of the Berliner Dom into a neo-Renaissance cathedral (replacing the classical cathedral designed by Schinkel) severely disrupted the classical ensemble, especially since the new cathedral has significantly larger dimensions than its predecessor.

During the era of Nazi Germany, the Altes Museum was used as the backdrop for propaganda, both in the museum itself and upon the parade grounds of the redesigned Lustgarten. Just before the end of Second World War, the museum was badly damaged when a tank truck exploded in front of the museum, and the frescoes designed by Schinkel and Peter Cornelius, which adorned the vestibule and the back wall of the portico, were largely lost.

Under General Director Ludwig Justi, the building was the first museum of Museum Island to undergo reconstruction and restoration, which was carried out from 1951 to 1966 by Hans Erich Bogatzky and Theodor Voissen. Following Schinkel's designs, the murals of the rotunda were restored in 1982. However, neither the ornate ceilings of the ground floor exhibition rooms nor the pairs of columns under the girders were reconstructed. The former connection to the Neues Museum has also not been rebuilt; instead, an underground passageway connecting all of the museums of Museum Island is planned as part of the Museumsinsel 2015 renovations.

Gallery

The Antiquities Collection

The Altes Museum was originally constructed to house all of the city's collections of fine arts, including Old Master paintings, and prints and drawings. However, since 1904, the museum has solely housed the Antikensammlung (Collection of Classical Antiquities). Since 1998, the Collection of Classical Antiquities has displayed its Greek collection, including the treasury, on the ground floor of the Altes Museum.  Special exhibitions are displayed on the second floor of the museum.

See also
 List of art museums
 List of museums in Berlin
 List of museums in Germany

Footnotes

Further reading
 Michael S. Cullen, Tilmann von Stockhausen: Das Alte Museum. Berlin-Edition, Berlin 1998, .
 Wolf-Dieter Heilmeyer, Huberta Heres, Wolfgang Maßmann: Schinkels Pantheon. Die Statuen der Rotunde im Alten Museum. Von Zabern, Mainz 2004, .
 Andreas Scholl, Gertrud Platz-Horster (Hrsg.): Altes Museum. Pergamonmuseum. Antikensammlung Staatlichen Museen zu Berlin. 3., vollständig überarbeitete und erweiterte Auflage. Von Zabern, Mainz 2007, .
 Jörg Trempler: Das Wandbildprogramm von Karl Friedrich Schinkel, Altes Museum Berlin. Gebr. Mann, Berlin 2001, .
 Elsa van Wezel: Die Konzeptionen des Alten und Neuen Museums zu Berlin und das sich wandelnde historische Bewusstsein. Gebr. Mann, Berlin 2003,  (=Jahrbuch der Berlin Museen N.F. Bd. 43, 2001, Beiheft).

External links
 Altes Museum at the website of the Berlin State Museums.
 Altes Museum at GreatBuildings.com.
 Altes Museum at Archiseek.com.
  Altes Museum at museum-location.de.
Virtual tour of the Altes Museum provided by Google Arts & Culture

 
 
Berlin State Museums
Museum Island
History museums in Germany
Karl Friedrich Schinkel buildings
Art museums and galleries in Berlin
Art museums established in 1830
1830 establishments in Prussia
Classicist architecture in Germany
Neoclassical architecture in Berlin
Museums of ancient Greece in Germany